Liu Wenjie may refer to:
 Liu Wenjie (government official)
 Liu Wenjie (footballer)